The 7th Bersaglieri Regiment is an active unit of the Italian Army based in Altamura in Apulia. The regiment is part of the army's infantry corps' Bersaglieri speciality and operationally assigned to the Mechanized Brigade "Pinerolo".

Current structure 
As of 2022 the 7th Bersaglieri Regiment consists of:

  Regimental Command, in Altamura
 Logistic Support Company
 10th Bersaglieri Battalion "Bezzecca"
 37th Maneuver Support Company "Ghepardi"
 38th Fusiliers Company "Falchi"
 39th Fusiliers Company "Aquile"
 40th Fusiliers Company "Tigri"

The Command and Logistic Support Company fields the following platoons: C3 Platoon, Transport and Materiel Platoon, Medical Platoon, and Commissariat Platoon. The regiment is equipped with Freccia wheeled infantry fighting vehicles. The Maneuver Support Company is equipped with Freccia mortar carries with 120mm mortars and Freccia IFVs with Spike LR anti-tank guided missiles.

See also 
 Bersaglieri

References

External links
Italian Army Website: 7th Bersaglieri Regiment

Bersaglieri Regiments of Italy
Military units and formations established in 1871
1871 establishments in Italy